Elvira Eliza Clain-Stefanelli (1914-2001) was a numismatist, director of the National Numismatic Collection of the Smithsonian Institution, and advisor to the US Mint.

Biography 
She was born in Bucharest, Romania and studied history at Franz Joseph University. She received a masters degree in history at the University of Cernauti. In 1939, she married Vladimir Clain-Stefanelli (1914-1982), whom she met in Rome. The Clain-Stefanellis later moved to Berlin and were conducting research on coins in 1943 when they were sent to the Buchenwald concentration camp because Vladimir's passport had been stolen and used by an "enemy of the state."

The Clain-Stefanellis emigrated to the United States in 1951. Elvira worked at Stack's Coin Galleries before joining the Smithsonian Institution in 1957, where Vladimir had been curator of the Division of Numismatics for one year. Over her several decades at the Smithsonian, she grew the National Numismatic Collection (NNC) from approximately 60,000 pieces in 1956 to over 960,000 pieces in 1982. She was appointed Executive Director of the NNC in 1983 and served in that role until her retirement in 2001.

In addition to her curatorial role at the Smithsonian, Clain-Stefanelli was an accomplished author, especially noted for her Numismatic Bibliography (1984), a work listing over 18,000 publications on all facets of numismatics.

In 1994, Clain-Stefanelli was appointed to the newly-formed Citizens Commemorative Coin Advisory Committee (the predecessor of the Citizens Coinage Advisory Committee), which was created by Congress to advise the Secretary of the Treasury on commemorative coin programs. She served on the committee until her death in 2001.

Elvira Clain-Stefanelli Memorial Award for Achievement in Numismatics
This award "was established and first given in 2013 to honor women who have made significant contributions to numismatics. These contributions, whether in research, leadership or mentorship, must have made a lasting impact on the numismatic community and demonstrated a lifelong commitment to the betterment of numismatics." Previous recipients of the award are:
 2021 Ellen Feingold
2020 Dorothy C. Baber
2019 Carrie Best
2018 Prue Morgan Fitts
 2017 Charmy Harker
2016 Mary Counts Burleson
 2015 Michele Orzano 
2014 Diane Piret 
 2013 Elvira Clain-Stefanelli

Publications
 The Beauty and Lore of Coins, Currency, and Medals (with Vladimir Clain-Stefanelli), Riverwood Publishers Ltd, 1974.
 Chartered for Progress : two Centuries of American Banking; a pictorial essay (with Vladimir Clain-Stefanelli), Acropolis Books, Ltd., 1975.
 Das Grosse Buch der Münzen und Medaillen (with Vladimir Clain-Stefanelli), Munich, Battenberg, 1976.
 Highlights from the Money Collection of the Chase Manhattan Bank, Washington, DC, Smithsonian Institution, 1979.
 "Italian Coin Engravers since 1800", Smithsonian Institution, Bulletin 229 (Contributions from the Museum of History and Technology, Paper 33), 1970.
 Life in Republican Rome on its Coinage, Washington, DC, Smithsonian Institution, 1999.
 Medals Commemorating Battles of the American Revolution (with Vladimir Clain-Stefanelli), Washington, DC, Smithsonian Institution, 1973.
 Monnaies européennes et monnaies coloniales américaines entre 1450 et 1789 (with Vladimir Clain-Stefanelli), Fribourg, Office du Livre, 1979.
 Numismatic Bibliography Munich, Battenberg, 1984.
 Select Numismatic Bibliography, Stack’s, 1965.

See also 
 Vladimir and Elvira Clain-Stefanelli papers, 1938-1972 (at the American Numismatic Society) 
 Elvira Clain-Stefanelli on WorldCat

References

1914 births
2001 deaths
American numismatists
Buchenwald concentration camp survivors
Women numismatists
Smithsonian Institution donors
Romanian emigrants to the United States